"Rolling Thunder" is a screamer composed by Henry Fillmore in 1916. It includes a fast and extremely technical trombone part. It has a fast and furious tempo and is performed as an opener or encore of concerts.

References

March music
1916 compositions
Concert band pieces